Gascoyne-Cecil is a surname, and may refer to:

 Georgina Gascoyne-Cecil, Marchioness of Salisbury (1827–1899), Lady of the Royal Order of Victoria and Albert
 James Gascoyne-Cecil, 2nd Marquess of Salisbury (1791–1868), English Conservative politician
 James Gascoyne-Cecil, 4th Marquess of Salisbury (1861–1947), Chancellor of the Duchy of Lancaster
 Jonathan Hugh Gascoyne-Cecil (1939–2011), known as Jonathan Cecil, English theatre, film and television actor
 Lord Edward Gascoyne-Cecil (1867–1918), British soldier and colonial administrator in Egypt
 Robert Gascoyne-Cecil, 3rd Marquess of Salisbury (1830–1903), British statesman and Prime Minister
 Robert Gascoyne-Cecil, 5th Marquess of Salisbury (1893–1972), prominent Tory politician
 Robert Gascoyne-Cecil, 6th Marquess of Salisbury (1916–2003), Conservative Member of Parliament for Bournemouth West
 Robert Gascoyne-Cecil, 7th Marquess of Salisbury (born 1946), Conservative politician
 William Gascoyne-Cecil (1863–1936), Bishop of Exeter

Compound surnames
Surnames of English origin